Robert Adetuyi is a Canadian screenwriter and film director who works in Hollywood. Born in Sudbury, Ontario, Adetuyi is a graduate of York University, where he studied communications and sociology. He moved to Hollywood in 1992.

Career
His screenwriting credits include Stomp the Yard, Code Name: The Cleaner, Turn It Up, You Got Served: Beat the World, Honey: Rise Up and Dance and High Chicago. He has directed Turn It Up, You Got Served: Beat the World, Bring It On: Worldwide Cheersmack, Trouble Sleeping and Stand!.

Along with his brothers Tom, Amos and Alfons, Adetuyi is a partner in the film and television production firm Inner City Films, whose productions have included the television series Jozi-H and Ekhaya: A Family Chronicle and the films High Chicago and Love Jacked.

References

External links 
 

Film directors from Ontario
21st-century Canadian screenwriters
Canadian people of Nigerian descent
Writers from Greater Sudbury
Living people
York University alumni
Black Canadian filmmakers
Canadian Film Centre alumni
Black Canadian writers
Year of birth missing (living people)
Film producers from Ontario
Canadian male screenwriters